This article gives an overview of the structure of environmental and cultural conservation in Scotland, a constituent country of the United Kingdom.

Upon the introduction of devolved government the environment and built heritage were not listed as reserved issues, and so for the most part conservation is the responsibility of the Scottish Parliament, the Scottish Government, and the public bodies that report to them. Although originally reserved, responsibility for all planning and nature conservation matters at sea up to 200 miles from the Scottish coast was transferred to the Scottish Government in 2008. Some matters related to conservation, such as international treaties and border controls on prohibited species, remain the responsibility of the UK Government.

Much environment legislation in Scotland is based on the adoption into Scots law of European Union directives, such as the Habitats Directive.  As such there may be changes to the structure and nature of conservation activities in Scotland following the UK's departure from the European Union.

Scottish Government

Scottish Government directorates
Conservation matters are dealt with across a number of directorates of the Scottish Government:

Environmental protection, forestry and biodiversity are the responsibility of the Environment and Forestry Directorate. 
The Marine Scotland Directorate is responsible for the integrated management of Scotland's seas. 
The Energy and Climate Change Directorate covers measures to reduce greenhouse gas emissions. 
Cultural Heritage is the responsibility of the Culture, Tourism and Major Events Directorate.

Scottish ministers
Three Cabinet Secretaries hold portfolios with responsibility for conservation issues:

The Cabinet Secretary for Net Zero, Energy and Transport has ministerial responsibility for many conservation issues, including cross-government co-ordination of Net Zero policy, climate crisis and environmental protection, biodiversity, sustainable development, renewable energy, energy and energy consents, flood prevention and coastal erosion, and water quality.
The portfolio of the Cabinet Secretary for Rural Affairs and Islands includes ministerial responsibility for agriculture and crofting, fisheries and aquaculture, and forestry.
The portfolio of the Cabinet Secretary for the Constitution, External Affairs and Culture includes ministerial responsibility for architecture and built heritage.

Public bodies

The following are public bodies of the Scottish Government, with notes on their areas of responsibility.

Executive agencies
Forestry and Land Scotland is responsible for management of the national forest estate.
Scottish Forestry is responsible for forestry regulation and support.

Executive non-departmental public bodies
Cairngorms National Park Authority
Historic Environment Scotland is responsible for cultural and built heritage.
Loch Lomond and the Trossachs National Park Authority
NatureScot is responsible for landscape protection and wildlife conservation.
The Royal Botanic Garden Edinburgh undertakes scientific study into plants and their conservation.
Scottish Environment Protection Agency is responsible for waterways, pollution and waste management.

Public corporations
Crown Estate Scotland is responsible for managing a range of rural, coastal and marine assets that are held 'in right of the Crown'.
Scottish Canals manages Scotland's inland waterways.

United Kingdom Government
Within the UK Government, environmental protection is the responsibility of the Department for Environment, Food and Rural Affairs (DEFRA). Two UK-wide executive agencies with responsibility for conservation matters include Scotland within their remit:
The Joint Nature Conservation Committee (JNCC) co-ordinates the work of the UK's nature conservation bodies (SNH being the Scottish body).
The Forestry Commission co-ordinates international forestry policy support and certain plant health functions in respect of trees and forestry.

Non-governmental organisations
Many non-governmental organisations are active in conservation issues in Scotland. The following list provides some examples.

Architectural Heritage Society of Scotland
Botanical Society of the British Isles
British Dragonfly Society
Buglife
Butterfly Conservation
Cockburn Association
Council for British Archaeology
Historic Churches Scotland
Institute of Conservation
John Muir Trust
Marine Conservation Society
National Trust for Scotland
Plantlife
Royal Scottish Forestry Society
Royal Society for the Protection of Birds (RSPB Scotland)
Royal Zoological Society of Scotland
Scottish Civic Trust
Scottish Ornithologists' Club
Scottish Wildcat Association
Scottish Wildlife Trust
Society for the Protection of Ancient Buildings
Trees for Life
Wildfowl and Wetlands Trust (WWT)
The Woodland Trust

Protected areas

National environmental designations
National parks — National parks of Scotland
National nature reserves
National scenic areas
Sites of Special Scientific Interest (SSSI) — Lists of Sites of Special Scientific Interest in Scotland
Nature Conservation Marine Protected Areas (MPA)

National designations for historic and cultural sites
Scheduled monuments
Listed buildings — Listed buildings in Scotland
Inventory of Gardens and Designed Landscapes in Scotland
Inventory of Historic Battlefields in Scotland
Historic Marine Protected Areas

International designations
World Heritage Sites — List of World Heritage Sites in Scotland
Ramsar sites — List of Ramsar sites in Scotland
Natura 2000
Special Areas of Conservation — List of Special Areas of Conservation in Scotland
Special Protection Areas —List of Special Protection Areas in Scotland

Local designations
Local nature reserves
Conservation areas
Regional parks

Non-statutory protected areas
Forest parks of Scotland

Objects of conservation

Abbeys and priories in Scotland
Castles in Scotland
Caledonian Forest
Fauna of Scotland
Flora of Scotland
Gardens in Scotland
Historic houses in Scotland
Lighthouses in Scotland
National Trust for Scotland
Scotland's Great Trails - long-distance trails

See also

Biodiversity Action Plan
List of Conservation topics
Article 4 direction
United Kingdom Biodiversity Action Plan (UKBAP)
Conservation in the United Kingdom

References